The 2009–10 season was AS Monaco FC's 33rd season in Ligue 1. Guy Lacombe was the club's coach, guiding them to 8th in the league, the Third Round of the Coupe de la Ligue and the Final of the Coupe de France were they lost to Paris Saint-Germain.

Squad

Out on loan

Transfers

Summer

In:

Out:

Winter

In:

 

Out:

Competitions

Ligue 1

League table

Results summary

Results by round

Results

Coupe de la Ligue

Coupe de France

Squad statistics

Appearances and goals

|-
|colspan="14"|Players away from the club on loan:

|-
|colspan="14"|Players who left Monaco during the season:

|}

Goal Scorers

Disciplinary record

Notes and references

Notes

References

AS Monaco FC seasons
Monaco
AS Monaco
AS Monaco